In descriptive statistics, the seven-number summary is a collection of seven summary statistics, and is an extension of the five-number summary. There are three similar, common forms.

As with the five-number summary, it can be represented by a modified box plot, adding hatch-marks on the "whiskers" for two of the additional numbers.

Seven-number summary
The following percentiles are (approximately) evenly spaced under a normally distributed variable:
 the 2nd percentile (better: 2.15%)
 the 9th percentile (better: 8.87%)
 the 25th percentile or lower quartile or first quartile
 the 50th percentile or median (middle value, or second quartile)
 the 75th percentile or upper quartile or third quartile
 the 91st percentile (better: 91.13%)
 the 98th percentile (better: 97.85%)

The middle three values – the lower quartile, median, and upper quartile – are the usual statistics from the five-number summary and are the standard values for the box in a box plot.

The two unusual percentiles at either end are used because the locations of all seven values will be approximately equally spaced if the data is normally distributed Some statistical tests require normally distributed data, so the plotted values provide a convenient visual check for validity of later tests, simply by scanning to see if the marks for those seven percentiles appear to be equal distances apart on the graph.

Notice that whereas the extreme values of the five-number summary depend on the number of samples, this seven-number summary does not, and is somewhat more stable, since its whisker-ends are protected from the usual wild swings in the extreme values of the sample by replacing them with the more steady 2nd and 98th percentiles.

The values can be represented using a modified box plot. The 2nd and 98th percentiles are represented by the ends of the whiskers, and hatch-marks across the whiskers mark the 9th and 91st percentiles.

Bowley’s seven-figure summary
Arthur Bowley used a set of non-parametric statistics, called a "seven-figure summary", including the extremes, deciles, and quartiles, along with the median. 

Thus the numbers are:
 the sample minimum
 the 10th percentile (first decile)
 the 25th percentile or lower quartile or first quartile
 the 50th percentile or median (middle value, or second quartile)
 the 75th percentile or upper quartile or third quartile
 the 90th percentile (last decile)
 the sample maximum

Note that the middle five of the seven numbers are very nearly the same as for the seven number summary, above.

The addition of the deciles allow one to compute the interdecile range, which for a normal distribution can be scaled to give a reasonably efficient estimate of standard deviation, and the 10% midsummary, which when compared to the median gives an idea of the skewness in the tails.

Tukey’s seven-number summary
John Tukey used a seven-number summary consisting of the extremes, octiles, quartiles, and the median.

The seven numbers are:
 the sample minimum
 the 12.5th percentile (first octile)
 the 25th percentile or lower quartile or first quartile
 the 50th percentile or median (middle value, or second quartile)
 the 75th percentile or upper quartile or third quartile
 the 87.5th percentile (last octile)
 the sample maximum

Note that the middle five of the seven numbers can all be obtained by successive partitioning of the ordered data into subsets of equal size. Extending the seven-number summary by continued partitioning produces the nine-number summary, the eleven-number summary, and so on.

See also
Three-point estimation
Stanine

Footnotes

References

Summary statistics